Tlacotepec Plumas is a town and municipality in Oaxaca in south-western Mexico. The municipality covers an area of  km². 
It is part of the Coixtlahuaca District in the Mixteca Region.

References

Municipalities of Oaxaca